Lucian Ionuț Filip (born 25 September 1990) is a former Romanian professional footballer who played as a defensive midfielder and as defender. Currently he is a fitness coach. In his career, Filip played mostly for FCSB, but also for teams such as Gloria Buzău or Concordia Chiajna, among others.

Club career

FCSB II

Filip played for FCSB's youth team until the autumn of 2008 when he was selected for the senior team. On this occasion he earned his first appearance at senior level for Steaua in Cupa României's Round of 32 where his team lost the game to Sportul Studențesc failing to advance in the next competition's round.

FCSB
After his first match at FCSB in the Cup he returned playing for the team's second squad only to return in the winter break after impressing coach Marius Lăcătuș. He is now waiting his first appearance for Steaua in the national league.

In July 2009, he was sent to the second team.

On 18 October 2009 he made his debut for FCSB in Liga I in the victory against Politehnica Iaşi.

In May 2012, after a series of good performances, he was included by Sport.ro in a Top 10 list of Romanian youths to watch.

Career statistics

Club

Managerial

Honours

Club
Steaua II București
Liga III: 2008–09
FCSB
Liga I: 2012–13, 2013–14, 2014–15
Cupa României: 2014–15, 2019–20
Cupa Ligii: 2014–15, 2015–16
Supercupa României: 2013

Notes
 The 2007–08 and 2008–09 Liga III appearances and goals made for FCSB II are unavailable.

References

External links
FCSB official profile 

1990 births
Living people
Sportspeople from Craiova
Romanian footballers
Association football midfielders
Liga I players
Liga II players
FC Gloria Buzău players
FC Steaua București players
FC Steaua II București players
CS Concordia Chiajna players
LPS HD Clinceni players
AS Voința Snagov players
FC Steaua București managers